Brandamore is an unincorporated community in West Brandywine Township in Chester County, Pennsylvania, United States. Brandamore is located at the intersection of Hibernia Road and Brandamore Road north of Coatesville.

References

Unincorporated communities in Chester County, Pennsylvania
Unincorporated communities in Pennsylvania